Chakor Buli Chavar castle is a historical castle located in Ilam County in Ilam Province.

References 

Castles in Iran